Cash is an unincorporated area in Hart County, Kentucky.

A post office called Cash was established in 1890, and remained in operation until 1955. One Mr. Cash, an early postmaster, gave the community his last name.

References

Unincorporated communities in Hart County, Kentucky
Unincorporated communities in Kentucky